Carlos Berlocq and Frederico Gil were the defending champions but Gil decided not to participate.
Berlocq played alongside Daniel Muñoz-de la Nava, however they were eliminated by Martin Fischer and Philipp Oswald in the semifinals.

Fischer and Oswald won this event. They claimed the title, defeating Martin Kližan and Uladzimir Ignatik in the final (6–3, 6–4).

Seeds

Draw

Draw
{{16TeamBracket-Compact-Tennis3
| RD1=First round
| RD2=Quarterfinals
| RD3=Semifinals
| RD4=Final

| RD1-seed01=1
| RD1-team01=

References
 Main Draw

Sporting Challenger - Doubles
Sporting Challenger